Santi Jacopo e Filippo or Santi Iacopo e Filippo  (or San Iacopo in Orticaia) is an ancient church found in Via San Michele degli Scalzi in Pisa, Italy. Documents exist as belonging to an Augustinian abbey by 1110. The Romanesque architecture includes a half-finished facade. Restored in the 17th and 18th century, the interior was frescoed by Francesco and his brother Giuseppe Melani with stories of the saints.

Sources
Pisan Tourism Site

Jacopo e Filippo
12th-century Roman Catholic church buildings in Italy